Forensic Files, originally known as Medical Detectives, is an American documentary television program that reveals how forensic science is used to solve violent crimes, mysterious accidents, and outbreaks of illness. The show was originally broadcast on TLC, narrated by Peter Thomas, and produced by Medstar Television, distributed by FilmRise, in association with truTV Original Productions. It broadcast 406 episodes from its debut on TLC in 1996 until its final episode in 2011. Reruns shown on HLN were initially retitled Mystery Detectives before settling on the main title of the show in 2014.

A version of the program was broadcast on Five in the United Kingdom, under the name Murder Detectives. Most of the 400 episodes are also available on the "Medical Detectives - Full Episodes" channel that is managed by distributor FilmRise.

On October 1, 2019, HLN announced it had greenlit a revival of the show, titled Forensic Files II, which began airing on February 23, 2020. Due to long-time narrator Peter Thomas' death, the show is narrated by Bill Camp.

Overview 
The show helped pioneer documentary-style crime-science shows. Its website says it profiles "puzzling, often baffling cases whose riddles are ultimately solved by forensic detection." The cases and people are real. Scientists and forensic experts in many fields are interviewed.
 
Not every case is a crime. In some cases, the investigation reveals that the suspects are innocent, and that a death was an accident or suicide. Several episodes profile people who have been jailed for or convicted of a crime and ultimately exonerated by forensic evidence. Other episodes focus on accidents where consulted experts relied on forensic evidence to explain why the incident occurred, such as the 1987 King's Cross fire and the 1993 Big Bayou Canot train wreck. Many of the accident investigation episodes were originally broadcast as a separate CourtTV program, Extreme Evidence, but are now rerun under the Forensic Files name and included in the Mystery Detectives rebranding.

Although Medical Detectives also showed episodes about how outbreaks of mysterious illnesses were tracked (such as Hantavirus and Legionellosis), most of them have been dropped in favor of episodes about criminal cases (and occasionally civil cases).

Episodes

Narration and cast 
Not every episode of Forensic Files was narrated by Peter Thomas, a well-known voice-over talent. Four special hour-long episodes ("Payback", "Eight Men Out", "See No Evil", and "The Buddhist Monk Murders") were narrated by Peter Dean due to a scheduling conflict. These episodes were originally broadcast on TLC in 2001 and all except for one ("Eight Men Out") aired for the first time on the HLN Network in 2016.

Each episode had a new 'cast', including interviews with witnesses, investigators, and forensic scientists. Many of the world's most well-known forensic analysts have appeared on the show (often in more than one episode), including Henry Lee, Cyril Wecht, William M. Bass, Alec Jeffreys, Skip Palenik, and Richard Souviron.

For the dramatic recreations, "lookalike" actors and models resembling the main figures in the story were found through a casting company in Allentown, Pennsylvania, or through "open" casting calls in New York and other cities.

Forensic Files II is different in one respect: it does not show the faces of the people who are re-creating the situation. "We don’t use dialogue in our recreations and [unlike the original series] we don’t shoot faces, like lookalikes or actors," Executive Producer Duffy said.

Production and title sequences 

The program began on the TLC Network in April 1996 as Medical Detectives. Old episodes of Medical Detectives now air on TruTV under the Forensic Files label. Overseas, the show airs under these two titles, and others, on various channels in over 100 countries. It is distributed by CABLEready.

For the first four seasons under the Medical Detectives name, the format of the show was generally the same as it would be in later seasons under its "Forensic Files" name, but there were slight differences. During the opening credits and after the title display of the show, the titles of the episodes appeared and they were each displayed distinctively. For example, "The Disappearance of Helle Crafts" depicted a jigsaw puzzle coming together that displayed a picture of Helle Crafts and this picture lead into the episode (under the Forensic Files name, this picture was replaced with another), and "Raw Terror" depicted the words in big red letters against a black screen. The titles were sometimes featured in a visual representation to accommodate the subject at hand. For example, "The Southside Strangler" depicted black and white buildings coming down the screen; the buildings were displayed there in order to represent the "southside" of wherever the crime happened in and Season 2's "The Common Thread" displayed the title through a use of small "thread" strands that dangled in full-view and formed the title. The re-enactment scenes for the first couple of seasons were displayed in black and white and an eerie music score with a tunnel-like echo voice was used in order to provide a more terrifying feel to the show.

When CourtTV acquired the rights to the show for its fifth season, the decision was made to rename the show Forensic Files in order to emphasize the forensic science that was performed on the cases and connect it better with other documentary/reenactment crime shows with a similar title such as The FBI Files and Cold Case Files. A new opening was produced for Seasons 5 and 6 (and a couple of Season 7) and it depicted footage from the first four seasons. The title display "Forensic Files" is depicted in big blue and red letters with a background light beaming across the "Forensic" part. This opening was later used for the Medical Detectives episodes, removing their original openings and distinctive title displays. Some episodes such as "Raw Terror" and "Foreign Body" were never incorporated under the Forensic Files name due to CourtTV's desire to have the show focus on crime-related episodes in favor of simple accidental virus ones as those episodes are; though some episodes that focused on bank robberies and attempts at poisoning, but no murders were still incorporated. Episodes such as "Raw Terror" and "Foreign Body" (along with a number of episodes from the Medical Detectives era) can be seen online only under its original format when they were aired as Medical Detectives.

In Season 7, a newer (and more well-known) opening sequence was made with an entirely new theme song, providing a more tech-based feel and featuring a new title format. The titles of the episodes are quickly scanned underneath the title displays. No footage from actual episodes is used and everything displayed is made exclusively for the opening. This opening was used on a number of rebranded Medical Detectives episodes; replacing the opening for Seasons 5 and 6 that was originally given to them. Episodes such as "The Southside Strangler" and "Legionnaires' Disease" can be seen with all three openings. Season 7's "Reel Danger" can be seen with two.

By Season 12, starting with the twentieth episode, the opening sequence was shortened entirely and as a result, just the title of the show is featured and the title of the episode displayed beneath it. The episodes from here on out now had a faster-paced opening preview of the episode with upbeat music and Peter Thomas starting off saying "Up Next...".

On October 1, 2019, HLN announced it had acquired the broadcasting rights from Medstar Television to produce a revival of the series, with the first season consisting of 16 half-hour episodes. The new show is titled Forensic Files II, and the first episode is scheduled to air on February 23, 2020 with Bill Camp serving as the new narrator.

Show format 

The show takes a "whodunit" approach, making each case a mystery that needs to be solved. Every half-hour episode follows one case from its initial investigation until the suspect(s) conviction, acquittal, or some other legal resolution. Pathologists, medical examiners, police officers, detectives, prosecutors, defense attorneys, friends and families of victims or suspects (if their cooperation is given) are all interviewed about their roles.

Video footage of the lab tests is shot in a modernistic film noir style, in dark, moodily lit settings with odd, glowing colors. The crimes and parts of the investigation are re-enacted with actors in dramatic recreations. These recreations are indicated by a change to a "filmized" look, as is done with many crime re-enactment shows. These recreations sometimes include alternate versions of the crime, which are eventually disproven by the science. This technique would later be appropriated, in a modified form, by the CBS television series CSI: Crime Scene Investigation—essentially a fictionalized big-budget version of Forensic Files. During the original run of the show as Medical Detectives, eerie vocal music was matched with the recreations in order to create a frightening atmosphere. This specific effect was discontinued after the move to Court TV.

For privacy considerations, the names of some victims and their families are changed, and case evidence featured within the show is re-created in order to protect their true identities. That is unless consent is given by the persons who are being spoken to, the show is not allowed to use the family's (or families') real name(s).

In 2006, Forensic Files "Advanced" episodes aired, which had older episodes interspersed with Pop-Up Video style factoids about the cases which were then being featured.

Sometimes, another case is mentioned which is similar to the one being aired. For example: "Cold Hearted" on "Freeze Framed" and "Past Lives" on "A Squire's Riches". In another episode that involves DNA evidence, the name of a man shown on an older episode was mentioned again and this time he was revealed to have been the first person put to death in the United States based on DNA evidence.

On re-runs of episodes on HLN, an update of the case is given on the criminals that were alive at the time the episodes were aired (deaths, parole, release, etc.).

Broadcast run and alternative titles 
Premiering just as the O. J. Simpson murder trial had focused attention on the world of DNA and forensics, Medical Detectives became a hit. It was one of the first of the popular forensic science shows. A few years later, Court TV acquired rights to broadcast the show and it quickly became the cornerstone of its primetime schedule, increasing its annual production run to 42 episodes. The show was retained after the network was renamed TruTV in 2008.

The show was so successful that, in 2002, NBC aired it as a summer replacement series, one of the first times in which a program produced for cable television was aired by a broadcast network in prime-time.

In 2009, truTV's sister network Turner Network Television ("TNT") began airing episodes in HD on Wednesday nights for the month of December.

The vast majority of the shows are in a half-hour format. However, some hour-long specials have been produced. Several of these have re-investigated famous cases such as The Norfolk Four, or even historic murders such as the Lindbergh kidnapping and the John F. Kennedy assassination.

Reruns were aired on Lifetime in the fall of 2011 under the Medical Detectives moniker. A year later, in October 2012, HLN began airing the reruns under the title Mystery Detectives. Beginning in January 2014, HLN switched to the "Forensic Files" title. On that network, it is increasingly being used to fill many time slots due to program cancellations by budget cuts. By 2016, the program took up about 58% of the entire HLN channel each week. In June 2014, the program aired nightly from 2am through 5am on CNN, before being removed due to industry and viewer criticism, along with continuing international breaking news events, and replaced with a CNN International simulcast. Since November 7, 2015, HLN has retitled the program "Forensic Files: Digital Details" and aired episodes that did not air on the channel before. The show led HLN in ratings in early 2015.

TruTV currently still holds the licensing rights to the Forensic Files name. The reruns were repackaged with a shorter intro, and (at the end of some episodes) updates on what became of the suspect(s) or parties involved since the final verdicts. (For example: At the end of the 1996 episode "The List Murders," it is mentioned that John List, convicted of murdering his entire family in 1971 and sentenced to life in prison, died in 2008.) In late 2014, Investigation Discovery started airing episodes under the "Cause of Death" title. Reruns of the show also are carried over-the-air on Court TV, sister channel Court TV Mystery, AMGTV and in off-network syndication. As of 2022 the entire catalogue of Forensic Files is available on Peacock, while a "Best of Forensic Files" series is available on Amazon Prime. It also currently has its own channel on Pluto TV.

HLN advertised "brand new episodes of Forensic Files" intermittently since 2014, when the advertised "new" episodes are actually just old episodes that had never aired on the network before and were "new" to HLN. The advertisement of "new" episodes caused confusion, with some viewers taking to Twitter to ask the show's creator, Paul Dowling, if the show was going back into production. The show's narrator, Peter Thomas, died on April 30, 2016, five years after the program went out of production. Dowling stated that Thomas "can't be replaced," thus eliminating any hopes of reviving the program. Despite this, the program was revived for an additional season for February 2020. Bill Camp was chosen to succeed Thomas as the show's narrator.

Home media 
In 2004, Court TV released a limited number of episodes on DVD. As of June 26, 2009, Amazon.com says the DVD has been discontinued by the manufacturer.

In August 2011, TGG Direct released 8 DVD collections each containing 12 episodes. These collections include "Historic Cases," "Convictions Overturned," "Death By Poison," "Crimes of Passion," "Kidnapping Cases," "Medical Mysteries," "Serial Killers" and "Sex Crimes."

As of February 2020, Netflix in the U.S. is streaming most of the 406 episodes, split into 9 collections; seasons 7–9 and 11–14 are also available on Hulu. The latter also planned to stream Forensic Files II on its premium subscription service.

Reception 

This basic cable offering has been reviewed infrequently by television critics. In August 2002, The Houston Chronicle compared it to an episode of Unsolved Mysteries: "A criminal story is told – the more bizarre the better; a mysterious element is introduced; and forensic experts solve the mystery. All that's missing is Robert Stack."

The Los Angeles Times gave this review in April 2001: "Although Forensic Files ably extends this specialized field to the masses and deploys its slick reenactments effectively, its jarring voice-over is the overcooked antithesis of the meticulous science it depicts."

Forensic Files II 

The new series, which had recently premiered its second season on July 11, 2021, uses the same formula as the original, though with a new narrator, Bill Camp. "We are telling the same kinds of stories in the same way," Executive Producer Nancy Duffy said in an interview. Instead of hiring actors to play the fictional roles, however, the new series uses "employees of CNN and HLN".

Forensic Files II began airing on February 23, 2020.

Other media 

The Official Forensic Files Casebook was published in 2004. The book recaps and expounds on some episodes, explains how the show is produced, and details why some proposed episodes were turned down. In it, the show's Executive Producer/Writer Paul Dowling says he was inspired to create the show because he had been present in Philadelphia during the outbreak of Legionellosis in 1976, as well as by the murder of Helle Crafts. The CDC's legionellosis investigation eventually became an episode of Medical Detectives, while the Crafts case was filmed as the program's pilot episode.

In January 2020, Forensic Files Podcast debuted and featured audio from a selection of the Forensic Files airings.

See also
Brian Keith Lord
The New Detectives

References

External links 
 
 
 

 
1990s American crime television series
1990s American documentary television series
1996 American television series debuts
2000s American crime television series
2000s American documentary television series
2010s American crime television series
2010s American documentary television series
2011 American television series endings
English-language television shows
Law enforcement in the United States
TLC (TV network) original programming
TruTV original programming
True crime television series